Arashi is a Japanese boy band.

 may also refer to:

People with the given name
, Japanese kickboxer and Muay Thai fighter
, Japanese boxer
,  Japanese film actor

Fictional characters
Arashi (comics), a superheroine in the universe of DC Comics
Arashi, nickname of Sayako Arashiyama, a character in the Japanese anime Natsu no Arashi!
Arashi Ishino, a character in the popular 1980s Japanese anime Game Center Arashi
Arashi, Nagi's sister in the My-Otome manga
Arashi Kishū, a member of the Dragons of Heaven in the series X
Arashi Mikami, protagonist of the Japanese manga series Triage X
, a member of Knights in the series Ensemble Stars!

Ships
Japanese destroyer Arashi

Places
 Arashi, Aruba, a beach on the Caribbean island

Other uses
Arashi, a stage name used by professional wrestler Isao Takagi
 Arashi (video game), a freeware remake of the Atari Tempest video game for Classic Mac OS
Arashi (film), a 1956 Japanese film
"Arashi" (song), a song by the boy band Arashi

Japanese masculine given names
Japanese-language surnames